Loyola Law School is the law school of Loyola Marymount University, a private Catholic university in Los Angeles, California. Loyola was established in 1920.

Academics 
Degrees offered include the Juris Doctor (JD); Master of Science in Legal Studies (MLS); Master of Laws (LLM); Master of Laws in Taxation; Juris Doctor/Master of Business Administration (JD/MBA); and Doctor of Juridical Science (JSD).  Loyola has been an American Bar Association (ABA) approved law school since 1935. It is a member of the Association of American Law Schools (AALS).

U.S. News & World Report ranked Loyola Law School 72nd in its "America's Best Graduate Schools 2021" feature.

Loyola Law School's campus is located just west of downtown Los Angeles. It consists of an open central plaza surrounded by several contemporary buildings designed by Frank Gehry. Its library has a collection of nearly 560,000 volumes.

Bar passage rate 
Loyola's first-time takers of the 2020 California Bar Exam passed at a rate of 88%, vs. the 77% rate for ABA-approved law schools.

Post-graduation employment

Class of 2018 
According to Loyola's official ABA-required disclosures for the class of 2018, 90% of graduates were employed within 10 months of graduation. About 85% were employed in full-time, long-term, bar-admission-required or JD-advantage jobs.

Class of 2017 
According to Loyola's official ABA-required disclosures for the class of 2017, 87% of graduates were employed within 10 months of graduation. About 70% were employed in full-time, long-term, bar-admission-required or JD-advantage jobs.

Class of 2016 
According to Loyola's official ABA-required disclosures for the class of 2016, 83% of graduates were employed within 10 months of graduation. About 72% were employed in full-time, long-term, bar-admission-required or JD-advantage jobs. The National Association for Law Placement created the term "JD Advantage" to "describe a category of jobs for which bar passage is not required but for which a JD degree provides a distinct advantage."

Classes prior to 2016 
According to Loyola's official ABA-required disclosures for the class of 2015, 87.7% of graduates were employed within 10 months of graduation. About 79.5% were employed in full-time, long-term, bar-admission-required or JD-advantage jobs.

According to Loyola's official ABA-required disclosures for the class of 2014, 81.06% of graduates were employed within 10 months of graduation. About 71% were employed in full-time, long-term, bar-admission-required or JD-advantage jobs.

According to Loyola's official 2013 ABA-required disclosures, 50.1% of the class of 2013 obtained full-time, long-term, JD-required employment nine months after graduation (excluding solo practitioners).

Costs 
The total cost of attendance (indicating the cost of tuition, fees, and living expenses) at Loyola Law School for the 2018–19 academic year is $89,326. The Law School Transparency estimated debt-financed cost of attendance for three years is $340,071.

Programs and clinics

Loyola's clinics 
Loyola Law School's 21 clinics include:

 Center for Conflict Resolution, which provides mediation, conciliation, and facilitation services, as well as conflict resolution training.
 Center for Juvenile Law and Policy, serves as a holistic law firm representing youths in juvenile court. A small group of students each year are selected for a year-long clinic, receiving trial advocacy and procedure training from its staff of attorneys and social workers. The CJLP includes the Juvenile Justice Clinic, the Juvenile Innocence & Fair Sentencing Clinic and the Youth Justice Education Clinic. On Nov. 20, 2017, the Everychild Foundation announced that the CJLP was awarded its 2017 annual $1 million competitive grant to develop a  program to train law students  to represent foster youth involved in both dependency and delinquency courts.
 Loyola's International Human Rights Clinic pursues human rights claims by citizens against countries, tribunals and more. Its work has included seeking to establish domestic violence as cause for refugee status. The clinic has more than two dozen matters pending before regional and international courts and tribunals.
 The Loyola Immigrant Justice Clinic has conducted more than 10,000 client consultations since its 2012 client-intake event.
 In Loyola's Street Law Teaching Practicum, a legal non-profit that helps clients extricate themselves from abusive relationships, students teach survivors of domestic violence about essential legal skills useful to rebuilding their lives.
 The Workers' Rights Clinic partners Loyola students with workers' rights lawyers from Asian Americans Advancing Justice-Los Angeles (AAJLA) and the Wage Justice Center to provide holistic services to low-wage immigrant workers in the areas of wage theft, employment discrimination, labor trafficking and retaliation

Other programs 
 Civil Justice Program, which convenes periodic conferences, seminars, and presentations, promotes and publishes scholarly research, and initiates cross-disciplinary projects.
 Cybersecurity & Data Privacy Law program, an interdisciplinary program run jointly with LMU's Seaver College of Science & Engineering, offers both lawyers and non-lawyers advanced skills training in compliance, incident response, risk assessment and more. Media reports have noted that the program will draw on the school's traditional strengths in intellectual property, digital privacy and cybercrime, as well as its connections to nearby Silicon Beach. The program is the first of its kind on the west coast.
 Entertainment Law Practicum, which provides students with hands-on experience in the entertainment industry while earning units toward their degree.
 Journalist Law School, providing fellowships to journalists for a legal study practicum . The program has been cited as an important way for journalists to grow vital skills.
 The Master of Science in Legal Studies is a program  for working  professionals to develop critical thinking and essential legal skills. There are six specializations: Corporate Law, Criminal Justice, Cybersecurity & Data Privacy, Entertainment Law, Intellectual Property and International Business Law.
 Public Interest Law Foundation (PILF),  a student-run organization focused on getting students involved in public interest causes and raising money for public interest grants.

Law reviews 
Loyola currently has three student-run and edited law reviews:
 Loyola of Los Angeles Law Review is a publication devoted to the advancement of legal scholarship. Publishing articles on all legal topics, the Review seeks to identify and advance new legal research by scholars, practitioners, and students. Authors have included former President Jimmy Carter and NPR Legal Affairs Nina Totenberg. The Loyola of Los Angeles Law Review celebrated its 50th anniversary in the 2017–18 academic year.
 Loyola of Los Angeles International & Comparative Law Review is dedicated to the advancement of legal scholarship  in the field of international law In April 2008, ILR held a symposium entitled Transformation in Iraq: From Ending a Modern War to Creating a Modern Peace. Using Iraq as a test case, the symposium sought to assess the legitimacy and viability of modern occupation law against  contemporary realities and recent developments in moral and political thought.
 Loyola of Los Angeles Entertainment Law Review publishes scholarly articles which frequently cover topics in constitutional law, sports law, intellectual property rights, communications regulation, antitrust law, employment law, contract law, corporate law, as well as computer and Internet law. ELR has also featured symposia on such topics as independent filmmaking, international rights of publicity, and the use of law and identity to script cultural production.

Trial advocacy and moot court 
Loyola's trial advocacy and moot court programs are ranked No. 4 nationally by U.S. News & World Report's "2020 Best Graduate Schools" rankings.

Study-abroad programs 
Loyola offers study-abroad programs for J.D. students in Beijing, China, and Bologna, Italy.

Notable Loyola Law people

Faculty 
Allan Ides, Professor (Loyola Law alumnus who served as U.S. Supreme Court Clerk)
Justin Hughes, Professor, former senior advisor to the Under Secretary of Commerce in the Obama Administration
Laurie L. Levenson, criminal law professor and media commentator
Jessica Levinson, Professor, President, LA Ethics Commission
Justin Levitt, Professor, former deputy assistant attorney general in the U.S. Justice Department, Civil Rights Division
Yxta Maya Murray, legal scholar and novelist
Cesare P.R. Romano, international law expert and human rights litigator

Former faculty 
Richard L. Hasen, election law expert
Terry J. Hatter Jr., Senior United States district judge of the United States District Court for the Central District of California.
Gerald Uelmen, part of the "dream team" assembled to defend O. J. Simpson

Staff

Former staff
Gotabaya Rajapaksa, 8th President of Sri Lanka, who formerly worked at Loyola Law as a systems integrator and Unix Solaris administrator.

Alumni

Attorneys and activists 
Gloria Allred, J.D. 1974, lawyer, radio talk show host and media personality; named one of Loyola's "50 Inspirational Alumni"
Johnnie Cochran, J.D. 1962, high-profile defense lawyer (deceased)
Ricardo Cruz, former Chicano Civil Rights Movement lawyer
Mark Geragos, J.D. 1982, high-profile defense lawyer, co-host of "reasonable doubt" podcast
Irving A. Kanarek, aerospace engineer and defense attorney for Charles Manson
Melanie E. Lomax, Civil Rights lawyer and former head of the Los Angeles Board of Police Commissioners
Hunter Lovins, co-author of Natural Capitalism
Edward L. Masry, plaintiff's lawyer portrayed in the movie Erin Brockovich
Carmen Milano, was a Cleveland lawyer before being disbarred and becoming a member of the Mafia in the 1980s.
Carol Schatz, Juris Doctor, Los Angeles civic leader 
Robert Shapiro, defense lawyer; name partner of Glaser Weil Fink Jacobs Howard Avchen & Shapiro
Edward Tabash, Board of Directors for the Center for Inquiry. Constitutional expert on Church State Issues.
Michael Trope, sports agent and divorce trial lawyer co-founder of Trope and Decarolis in Los Angeles.
Laura Wasser, attorney specializing in divorce and well-known for her celebrity clients.

Judiciary 
Lynn "Buck" Compton, former California Court of Appeal Justice, former Los Angeles chief deputy prosecutor known for the prosecution of Sirhan Sirhan and member of the Band of Brothers
Rick Distaso, judge and former prosecutor
Otto Kaus, former Associate Justice of the California Supreme Court
R. Gary Klausner, federal judge sitting in the United States District Court for the Central District of California
Kathryn Doi Todd, of the California Court of Appeal
Manuel Real, federal judge sitting in the United States District Court for the Central District of California
John F. Walter, federal judge sitting in the United States District Court for the Central District of California
William F. Rylaarsdam, of the California Court of Appeal
Michael T. Sauer, Superior Court judge and former appellate lawyer
Carolyn Turchin, retired (2010) United States Magistrate Judge

Political figures 
Eloise Reyes J.D. California State Assembly.
Ben Cayetano, J.D. 1971, former Governor of Hawaii
William P. Clark Jr., J.D. 1957, former Associate Justice of the California Supreme Court, Deputy Secretary of State, National Security Advisor and Secretary of the Interior
Mike Gatto, J.D. 2004 (evening program) California State Assemblyman representing the 43rd Assembly District
Tom Harman, J.D. 1968, California State Senator representing the 35th Senate District
Sung Kim, United States Ambassador to the Philippines as well as the former United States Special Representative for North Korea Policy.
Alejandro Mayorkas, United States Secretary of Homeland Security
Robert Joseph Miller, J.D. 1971, former governor of Nevada
Kevin Murray, J.D. 1987, former California State Senator representing the 26th Senate District
Diane Patrick, J.D. 1980, labor lawyer and former First Lady of Massachusetts (2007–2015) 
Nick Pacheco, a former member of the Los Angeles City Council
Eric J. Perrodin, Mayor of Compton, California
Tony Rackauckas, J.D. 1971, District Attorney of Orange County and former Superior Court Judge
Richard Bloom, J.D. 1978, Member of the California State Assembly from the 50th District and former Mayor of Santa Monica
Libby Schaaf, J.D. 1993, 50th Mayor of Oakland, California

Other distinguished alumni 
James L. Barrett, winemaker
Tammara Billik, noted casting director
Gene Bleymaier, athletic director at Boise State University
David W. Burcham, constitutional law scholar and President of Loyola Marymount University
John Edward Anderson, president of Topa Equities, Ltd., founder of Kindel & Anderson law firm, namesake of UCLA Anderson School of Management (deceased)
Tony Blankley, editor at The Washington Times (deceased)
Joe Escalante, punk-rock musician and record label entrepreneur
Josh E. Gross, publisher of Beverly Hills Weekly
Pat Haden, former NFL quarterback and current athletic director at the University of Southern California
John C. "Pappy" Herbst, flying ace and war hero (of World War II)
Craig Kirkwood, actor (played "Rev" in Remember the Titans)
Gary Knell, president and CEO of the National Geographic Society
Chris Kobin, screenwriter and producer
Darren Levine, martial artist and entrepreneur
Bob Myers, J.D. 2003, general manager for the Golden State Warriors in the NBA
Gordon Naccarato, chef and restaurateur
Adam Nimoy, television director
Clark A. Peterson, founder of Necromancer Games
Ian Sander, television producer
Wilfred Von der Ahe, co-founder of Vons supermarket chain
Rhoda Walsh international bridge champion
Henry C. Yuen, co-founder, and former CEO and Chairman, of Gemstar-TV Guide International.

See also 
Law school rankings in the United States

References

External links 

 

Loyola Marymount University
Universities and colleges in Los Angeles
ABA-accredited law schools in California
Catholic law schools in the United States
 
Loyola Marymount University Law
Westlake, Los Angeles
Educational institutions established in 1911
1911 establishments in California
1980s architecture in the United States
Frank Gehry buildings
Postmodern architecture in California